Ackermans is a South African chain of clothing retail stores. Founded in 1916 in Wynberg, Cape Town, Ackermans has over 700 stores across Southern Africa, including in Namibia, Botswana, Lesotho, eSwatini and Zambia, and is headquartered in Kuilsrivier near Cape Town. In 2015 Ackermans is rated the second best clothing store by the South African Consumer Satisfaction Index.

History
Ackermans began in 1916 when Gus Ackerman opened the very first store in Wynberg, Cape Town, South Africa

In 1960, Ackermans was sold to Greatermans.

in 1970, Ackermans was sold to Edgars who maintained its successful price discounter position.

In 1984, Pepkor acquired Ackermans. At the time, there were 34 stores across the country.

By the turn of the century Ackermans  grew to over 200 stores across Southern Africa. By the end of the 2002/2003 financial year our stores numbered 284.

Today, with more than 450 stores in Southern Africa, the business is set to exceed R5 billion in turnover.

Awards 
Ackermans have received many awards

References

Companies based in Cape Town
Retail companies established in 1916
Discount stores
Clothing retailers of South Africa
South African brands